Sphagniana sphagnorum, the bog katydid, is the only species in the family Tettigoniidae (order Orthoptera) endemic to Canada. It frequents black-spruce sphagnum bogs across the Canadian northwest from Ontario to the Yukon. The two-part song of the males is remarkable among acoustic insects for alternating between two sound spectra: high audio sound frequencies are changed for ultrasonic frequencies every quarter second (Morris 1970). The forewings rub to and fro, drawing a scraper on one forewing along a row of teeth (file) on the other forewing and sending thin glassy wing cells into oscillation to radiate sound; two different regions of this file are used for the two spectra (Morris & Pipher 1972).

References

Morris G.K. 1970. Sound analyses of Metrioptera sphagnorum (Orthoptera: Tettigoniidae). Canadian Entomologist 102: 363-368.
Morris G.K., Pipher R.E. 1972. The relation of song structure to tegminal movement in Metrioptera sphagnorum (Orthoptera: Tettigoniidae). Canadian Entomologist 104: 977-985.

Tettigoniidae